This list of historical markers installed by the National Historical Commission of the Philippines (NHCP) in Calabarzon (Region IV-A) is an annotated list of people, places, or events in the region that have been commemorated by cast-iron plaques issued by the said commission. The plaques themselves are permanent signs installed in publicly visible locations on buildings, monuments, or in special locations.

While many Cultural Properties have historical markers installed, not all places marked with historical markers are designated into one of the particular categories of Cultural Properties.

In 2004, the NHCP approved a marker for the Alberto House, Biñan for its historicity in relation to Teodora Alonso, José Rizal, and the city. However, the marker did not push through because the owner refused to follow preservation requests.

On March 18, 2015, a marker pertaining to the Jabidah massacre was installed in Corregidor, Cavite City. Despite referring to the said event, the marker was entitled "Mindanao Garden of Peace, Corregidor Island" and did not contain the name "Jabidah."

A marker, commemorating National Artist Vicente Manansala was moved from his house in Binangonan to Holy Angel University, Angeles City.

This article lists two hundred seventy-three (273) markers from the CALABARZON Region.

Batangas
This article lists forty-four (44) markers from the Province of Batangas.

Cavite
This article lists ninety-four (95) markers from the Province of Cavite.

Laguna
This article lists sixty-six (67) markers from the Province of Laguna.

Quezon
This article lists three (40) markers from the Province of Quezon.

Rizal
This article lists twenty-seven (27) markers from the Province of Rizal.

See also
List of Cultural Properties of the Philippines in Calabarzon

References

Footnotes

Bibliography 

A list of sites and structures with historical markers, as of 16 January 2012
A list of institutions with historical markers, as of 16 January 2012

External links
A list of sites and structures with historical markers, as of 16 January 2012
A list of institutions with historical markers, as of 16 January 2012
National Registry of Historic Sites and Structures in the Philippines
Policies on the Installation of Historical Markers

Historical markers
Calabarzon
Historical markers